The KwaZulu-Natal Elimination and Prevention of Re-emergence of Slums Act, 2007 (the "KZN Slums Act") was a provincial law dealing with land tenure and evictions in the province of KwaZulu-Natal in South Africa.

The Act

The Slums Act was a highly controversial Act supported by the Provincial Government of KwaZulu-Natal as a response to housing conditions. Its stated purpose was to eliminate substandard housing conditions by giving the provincial Housing MEC authority to prescribe a time in which it would be compulsory for municipalities to evict unlawful occupiers of slums when landowners failed to do so. It also forced private landowners to evict shack dwellers. It was meant to be replicated in all other South African provinces.

The Act was widely criticised by civil society organisations and academics who said it was in conflict with the South African Constitution and PIE Act and who considered it to be repressive and anti-poor legislation.

Constitutional Court of South Africa judgment

The road to the Constitutional Court

The squatters' movement Abahlali baseMjondolo took the government to court to have the Act declared unconstitutional. It lost in the KwaZulu-Natal High Court, Durban but then appealed directly to the Constitutional Court.

Abahlali baseMjondolo argued that the province was mandated to deal with housing rather than land tenure and that the act dealt with evictions and slum eradication rather than the provision of housing. They also argued that the act was vague and gave too much power to the provincial government that was in conflict with section 26 of the constitution that deals with housing and eviction rights.

The Act judged unconstitutional

On 14 October 2009, the South African Constitutional Court found the law to be in conflict with the Constitution and struck it down. Costs were awarded to Abahlali baseMjondolo. According to the judgement, the legislation would have allowed for the possibility of mass evictions without the possibility of suitable alternative accommodation and would have therefore violated the Prevention of Illegal Evictions Act (PIE Act) and South Africa's Constitution.

Intimidation and violence following the judgment

It was reported that following the judgment members of the movement were publicly threatened for their comments criticising the Slums Act. It has also been argued that the judgment was a key factor in the armed attack on Abahlali baseMjondolo in the Kennedy Road shack settlement in Durban in September 2009.

Significance of the judgment

The Slums Act is one of the best known judgments by the Constitutional Court in South Africa. It has been argued that after the judgment the state abandoned its plans to eradicate shack settlements by 2014.

See also
2007 KwaZulu-Natal Elimination & Prevention of Re-emergence of Slums Act
October 2009 Constitutional Court Judgement on the KwaZulu-Natal Elimination & Prevention of Re-emergence of Slums Act
Video: 'From Shacks to the Constitutional Court'
Slums Act digital archive
‘From shack to the Constitutional Court’: The litigious disruption of governing global cities, by Anna Selmeczi, Utrecht Law Review, April 2011
How People Face Evictions, Prof. Yves Cabannes et al., Development Planning Unit, University College of London (DPU/UCL), May 2011
The KwaZulu-Natal Slums Bill: An Illustration of an Institutional Shift in Democracy, by Mikelle Adgate, Scot Dalton, Betsy Fuller Matambanadzo, Perspectives on Global Issues, Fall, 2008
Interview with Mnikelo Ndabankulu in The Guardian (UK), Mnikelo Ndabankulu, 2009
Cities with ‘Slums’: From Informal Settlement Eradication to a Right To The City In Africa, by Marie Huchzermeyer, University of Cape Town Press, 2011
 Constitutional Court more pro-poor than the government, Pierre de Vos, Constitutionally Speaking, 2011
 Marie Huchzermeyer, (2011).Cities with ‘Slums’: From Informal Settlement Eradication to a Right To The City In Africa University of Cape Town Press, Cape Town
 Anna Selmeczi, 2012 "We are the people who do not count": Thinking the disruption of the biopolitics of abandonment, PhD Thesis
 Mark Hunter & Dorrit Posel, 2012 Here to work: the socioeconomic characteristics of informal dwellers in post-apartheid South Africa, Environment & Urbanization Copyright Vol 24.(1), pp. 285–304. DOI: 10.1177/0956247811433537
 "What He Has Been Jailed For, Has Never Been Achieved": A Film Review of Dear Mandela, by Charles F. Peterson, The Journal of African Philosophy, Vol.5, 2012

References

South African legislation
Urban planning in South Africa
Housing in South Africa
2007 in South African law